Love Never Fails is the sixth studio album by gospel artist Micah Stampley, his debut on Motown Gospel. Stampley and his wife Heidi co-wrote six of the eleven songs on the album. This album produced the single "Our God".

Track listing

Personnel

Vocals
Micah Stampley
Desmond Ellington
Rachel Bethea-James
Zaviel Janae Slack
Shenique Walker-Shanklin
Terrence Williams
Krystal Johnson

Instrumentalist
Keyboards: Asaph Ward, Aaron Lindsey
Drums: J. Drew Sheard
Percussion: Javier Solís
Bass Guitar: Anthony "AJ" Brown Jr.
Acoustic Guitar: Timothy Mole
Trumpet: James Williams
Sax: Randy Allison
Trombone: Yanker Gonzales
Horn: Oasis Horns
Strings: John Stoddart, Edward "Eddie" Brown
Piano: Aaron Lindsey, Edward "Eddie" Brown
Violin: Nicole Neely
Organ: Kevin Powell

Technical credits
Micah Stampley: Composer, Producer, Executive Producer
Heidi Stampley: Composer, Executive Producer, Production Coordination, Booking, Management
Jarrett P. Dyson: A&R
Darryl Woodson: Arranger
Mike Zuñiga: Horn Engineer
J. Drew Sheard: Drums, Drum Programming
Karen S. Jackson: Creative Director
Aaron Lindsey: Composer, Producer
Jonathan Stockstill: Composer
Jonas Myrin: Composer
Brendan Graham: Composer
Rolf Løvland: Composer
Rasteen Wilson: Composer
Joseph Oscar: Composer
Chevelle Franklyn: Composer
Chris Rice: Composer
Matt Redman: Composer
Chris Tomlin: Composer
Jesse Reeves: Composer
Will McPhaul: Engineer
Mic Fontaine: Photography
Kendrick Lewis: Art Direction
Beatrice "B" Benbow: Stylist
Paul Salveson: Mixing
Asaph Ward: Arranger, Drum Programming, Engineer
Denise Brown: Legal Advisor
Vinnie Alibrandi: Mastering
James Williams: Arranger

Chart performance
Love Never Fails debuted in the Top 10 on Billboard’s Top Gospel Albums Chart and peaked at #9 on the Billboard Top Gospel Albums chart. It produced the single "Our God", which peaked in the Top 10 on Billboard’s Hot Gospel Song Chart and remained in the Top 15 for 26 weeks.

References

2013 albums